Kurt Peter (born May 29, 1934) is a Swiss former ice hockey player who competed for the Swiss national team at the 1956 Winter Olympics in Cortina d'Ampezzo.

References

External links
Kurt Peter statistics at Sports-Reference.com

1934 births
Living people
Ice hockey players at the 1956 Winter Olympics
Olympic ice hockey players of Switzerland
Swiss ice hockey defencemen